Blue Angels: Formation Flight Simulation is a 1989 video game developed by Artech and published by Accolade.

Gameplay
Blue Angels is a flight simulator.

Reception
Lt. H. E. Dille reviewed the game for Computer Gaming World, and stated that "Blue Angels deserves a fair amount of consideration based on novelty alone. As such, the product is recommended, with [...] reservations, to PC pilots seeking a change of pace."

In 1996, Computer Gaming World declared Blue Angels the 3rd-worst computer game ever released.

Reviews
Power Play (German magazine) (1990-03)
Amiga Computing Vol 3 No 3 (Aug 1990)

References

External links
Blue Angels: Formation Flight Simulation at Hall of Light Amiga database

Review in Compute!'s Gazette
Review in Info

1989 video games
Accolade (company) games
Amiga games
Artech Studios games
Atari ST games
Commodore 64 games
DOS games
Flight simulation video games
Video games developed in Canada